Varva may refer to:

 Varva, Iran
 Varva, Ukraine
 Varva, Reidgotaland